Alina Drăgan (born May 11, 1969 in Bucharest) is a retired Romanian rhythmic gymnast.

She competed for Romania in the rhythmic gymnastics all-around competition at the 1984 Olympic Games in Los Angeles. She finished 2nd in the qualification and just out of the medals (4th) overall.

References

External links 
 Alina Drăgan at Sports-Reference.com

1969 births
Living people
Romanian rhythmic gymnasts
Gymnasts at the 1984 Summer Olympics
Olympic gymnasts of Romania
Gymnasts from Bucharest